Price is an unincorporated community in Monongalia County, West Virginia, United States.

References 

Unincorporated communities in West Virginia
Unincorporated communities in Monongalia County, West Virginia